Fathers and Grandfathers is a 1982 Soviet comedy film directed by Yuri Yegorov.

Plot 
The film tells about the full energy of a pensioner who decides to prove to everyone that his life has just begun.

Cast 
 Anatoliy Papanov as Grandfather
 Valentin Smirnitskiy as Father
 Aleksey Yasulovich as Grandson (as Alyosha Yasulovich)
 Galina Polskikh
 Lyudmila Arinina as Popova
 Lidiya Kuznetsova
 Yevgeni Lazarev
 Nikolay Trofimov as Semyon Ilyich
 Vadim Andreev
 Nikolay Merzlikin

References

External links 
 

1982 films
1980s Russian-language films
Soviet comedy films
1982 comedy films